Reunion is a live album by English heavy metal band Black Sabbath, released on 19 October 1998. As implied by the title, the album features a reunion of the original Black Sabbath lineup of vocalist Ozzy Osbourne, guitarist Tony Iommi, bassist Geezer Butler and drummer Bill Ward. The album represents the first new release featuring that version of the group since 1978's Never Say Die! and Osbourne's subsequent firing the following year. Black Sabbath received their first ever Grammy Award in 2000 for the live recording of "Iron Man" taken from Reunion.

Background
Six years after founding member Ozzy Osbourne departed Black Sabbath under less than amicable circumstances, he briefly rejoined his former bandmates for a single performance on 13 July 1985 at the Live Aid benefit concert in Philadelphia, and again in 1992 for the climax of his No More Tours farewell tour. Much to the dismay of fans, neither brief reconciliation had resulted in a full-fledged Black Sabbath reunion resulting in a new album and tour. A serious attempt at a reunion in 1993 proved fruitless as the band members lamented the reappearance of old animus. In 1997, Osbourne, Iommi and Butler reunited for the 1997 Ozzfest shows as Black Sabbath. Ward was absent due to health issues, and he was replaced by Faith No More's Mike Bordin. Ward had made a brief return to Black Sabbath for a short South American tour in 1994, but it was with Tony Martin fronting the band. Anticipation for a full and meaningful reunion of the Osbourne-era version of the band was high.

Recording
By late 1997, all four original members put aside their differences and misgivings and two shows in their hometown at the Birmingham NEC Arena were booked. On 4 and 5 December 1997, the four original members of Black Sabbath performed together with the shows recorded for a highly anticipated live album release. Ward had a heart condition, and concern regarding his health and ability to perform at a high level meant that another former Black Sabbath drummer, Vinny Appice, was on standby for the two homecoming shows. "We hadn't done a show with Bill for 18 years," remarked Iommi. Ward made it through both shows – albeit not without incident:

Along with live versions of classics such as "Paranoid", "N.I.B.", "Black Sabbath" and "Iron Man", the double album also included two newly recorded studio tracks: "Selling My Soul" and "Psycho Man". These two new tracks were also released on a CD single in the United States. Music critics applauded the band's decision to surprise fans by including unexpected songs which had not been played live in many years, such as "Spiral Architect" and "Behind the Wall of Sleep".

Track listing

Personnel
Black Sabbath
 Ozzy Osbourne – vocals
 Tony Iommi – guitars
 Geezer Butler – bass 
 Bill Ward – drums (all except "Selling My Soul")

Additional personnel
 Geoff Nicholls – keyboards, guitars

Technical personnel
Thom Panunzio – producer, engineer (live tracks)
Bob Marlette – producer and engineer (studio tracks), mixing at Rockfield Studios and A&M Studios
Greg Hackett, Barry Clempson – engineers
Phil Ault, John Aguto, Phil Hopkins – assistant engineers
Andrew Garver – digital editing
David Collins – mastering
Glen Wexler – cover design and photography

Charts

Album

Singles – Billboard (North America)

Certification

References 

1998 live albums
Albums produced by Bob Marlette
Black Sabbath live albums
Epic Records live albums